The 2017 New Zealand Grand Prix event for open wheel racing cars was held at Circuit Chris Amon near Feilding on 12 February 2017. It was the sixty-second New Zealand Grand Prix and fielded Toyota Racing Series cars. The event was also the third race of the fifth round of the 2017 Toyota Racing Series, the final race of the series.

Report

Practice

Race 1

Qualifying

Race

Race 2

Race 3

Qualifying

Race 
Daruvala led a flag-to-finish victory to win his first New Zealand Grand Prix and become the first Indian to do so. Marcus Armstrong finished a strong second, staying in contention for the most of the race. Thomas Randle finished third and in doing so, won the 2017 Toyota Racing Series championship, with a five-point margin over nearest contender, Pedro Piquet. The first lap saw a major incident where Christian Hahn and Luis Leeds collided at turn seven - causing the former to roll and crash heavily.

Championship standings 

Drivers' Championship standings

References

New Zealand Grand Prix
New Zealand Grand Prix
New Zealand Grand Prix